Brett Wilson may refer to:
 Brett Wilson (American football), born 1960, American football running back
 Brett Wilson (rugby union), New Zealand rugby union player
 W. Brett Wilson, Canadian entrepreneur
 Brett Michael Wilson, American actor and musician